Rudolf Paszek (19 March 1894 in Dolní Marklovice – 29 November 1969 in Český Těšín) was a Polish teacher, national activist, community organizer and politician from the region of Zaolzie, Czechoslovakia. He was a member of various organizations active amongst the Polish minority in interbellum Czechoslovakia.

Paszek was born in the family of Mateusz Paszek, a coal miner employed at Gabriela Mine in Karviná. He gained the education as a teacher. When World War I broke out, Paszek was conscripted to the Austro-Hungarian Army. He fought in Albania, where he was wounded. After returning from the war, Paszek continued his teaching career, becoming a principal of a Polish school in Śląska Ostrawa in 1921. Five years later he was named a principal of a Polish school in Jabłonków.

Paszek was active in the life of the Polish community of Jabłonków. He was a member of several organizations, including the Association of Silesian Catholics, Sokół and scouting organizations. In 1932, Paszek was elected as a mayor of Jabłonków. He held this function until October 1938.

After the annexation of Zaolzie region to Poland in 1938, President Ignacy Mościcki named him a deputy of the Silesian Parliament, where Paszek was a deputy until the outbreak of World War II. He was awarded the Knight's Cross of the Order of Polonia Restituta. In November 1938 he entered the local Zaolzie chapter of the Camp of National Unity.

In October 1939, Paszek was arrested by Nazi Germans and imprisoned. In April 1940 he was moved to the Sachsenhausen concentration camp, and in September subsequently transferred to Dachau concentration camp, where he was incarcerated for the rest of the war.

In 1948, he moved with his family to Český Těšín, where he was named as a principal of Polish school there. Three years later Paszek suffered a heart attack, as a result he retired from his job. He died on 29 November 1969, suffering a fourth stroke.

References

1894 births
1969 deaths
Polish schoolteachers
Polish politicians
Polish people from Zaolzie
Austro-Hungarian military personnel of World War I
Polish people of World War I
Members of Silesian Parliament
Recipients of the Order of Polonia Restituta
Dachau concentration camp survivors
Sachsenhausen concentration camp survivors
Mayors of places in the Czech Republic
People from Karviná District
Polish Roman Catholics